Cochemiea tetrancistra is a species of fishhook cactus known by the common name common fishhook cactus. It is native to the Mojave and Sonoran Deserts of northern Mexico and the southwestern United States, where it grows in a variety of desert habitat types.

Description 
This cactus generally has a single cylindrical stem a few centimeters wide and up to about 25 centimeters tall. Each cluster of spines is made up of 3 or 4 dark, hooked central spines and many straight, white radial spines, the longest reaching 2.5 centimeters in length. The flower is 2 to 4 centimeters wide and pink to lavender in color. The fruit is red, shiny, and fleshy and contains many black seeds coated in corky arils.

External links
Jepson Manual Treatment — Mammillaria tetrancistra
USDA Plants Profile for Mammillaria tetrancistra
Flora of North America
Mammillarias.net Profile
Cochemiea tetrancistra — UC Photo gallery

tetrancistra
Cacti of Mexico
Cacti of the United States
Flora of the California desert regions
Flora of the Sonoran Deserts
Flora of Arizona
Flora of Nevada
Flora of Sonora
Flora of Utah
Natural history of the Colorado Desert
Natural history of the Mojave Desert
North American desert flora
Taxa named by George Engelmann
Flora without expected TNC conservation status